Paradiaptomus is a genus of crustacean in the family Diaptomidae. It includes the following species:

Paradiaptomus africanus (Daday, 1910)
Paradiaptomus alluaudi (Guerne & Richard, 1890)
Paradiaptomus barnardi (G. O. Sars, 1927)
Paradiaptomus biramata Lowndes, 1930
Paradiaptomus desertorum Manuilova, 1951
Paradiaptomus excellens (Kiefer, 1929)
Paradiaptomus falcifer (Lovén, 1846)
Paradiaptomus furcata (Brehm, 1958)
Paradiaptomus greeni (Gurney, 1906)
Paradiaptomus hameri Rayner, 1999
Paradiaptomus lamellatus G. O. Sars, 1895
Paradiaptomus meus (Gurney, 1905)
Paradiaptomus natalensis (Cooper, 1906)
Paradiaptomus peninsularis Rayner, 1999
Paradiaptomus rex Gauthier, 1951
Paradiaptomus schultzei Douwe, 1912
Paradiaptomus similis Douwe, 1912
Paradiaptomus simplex (Kiefer, 1929)
Paradiaptomus warreni Rayner, 1999

References

Diaptomidae
Taxonomy articles created by Polbot